Moët & Chandon, also known simply as Moët, is a French fine winery and co-owner of the luxury goods company LVMH Moët Hennessy Louis Vuitton SE. Moët et Chandon is one of the world's largest champagne producers and a prominent champagne house. Moët et Chandon was established in 1743 by Claude Moët, and today owns  of vineyards, and annually produces approximately 28,000,000 bottles of champagne.

History
Moët et Chandon began as Moët et Cie (meaning "Moët & Co."), established by Épernay wine trader Claude Moët in 1743, and began shipping his wine from Champagne to Paris. The reign of King Louis XV coincided with increased demand for sparkling wine. Soon after its foundation, and after son Claude-Louis joined Moët et Cie, the winery's clientele included nobles and aristocrats.

In 1833, the company was renamed Moët et Chandon after Pierre-Gabriel Chandon de Briailles, Remy Moët's son-in-law, joined the company as a partner of Jean-Remy Moët, Claude Moët's grandson.

Following the introduction of the concept of a vintage champagne in 1840, Moët marketed its first vintage in 1842. Their best-selling brand, Brut Imperial, was introduced in the 1860s. Their best known label, Dom Perignon, is named for the Benedictine monk remembered in legend as the "Father of Champagne". The brand was owned by Champagne Mercier but was given to Moët in 1927.

Moët & Chandon merged with Hennessy Cognac in 1971 and with Louis Vuitton in 1987 to become LVMH (Louis-Vuitton-Moët-Hennessy), the largest luxury group in the world, netting over 16 billion euros in fiscal 2004. Moët & Chandon was holding a royal warrant as supplier of champagne to Queen Elizabeth II.

In 2006, Moët et Chandon Brut Impérial issued an extremely limited bottling of its champagne named "Be Fabulous", a special release of its original bottle with decorative Swarovski crystals, marking the elegance of Moët et Chandon.

Dom Pérignon

Dom Pérignon is a brand of champagne produced by Moët & Chandon. It is named after Dom Pierre Pérignon, a Benedictine monk who was an important quality pioneer for Champagne wine but who, contrary to popular myths, did not discover the champagne method for making sparkling wines. Dom Pérignon was the first prestige cuvée, an idea proposed by Englishman Laurence Venn. The first vintage of Dom Pérignon was 1921 and was only released for sale in 1936. It is a vintage champagne, meaning that it is only made in the best years, and all grapes used to make the wine are harvested in the same year. Many champagnes, by contrast, are non-vintage, meaning that the champagne is made from grapes harvested in various years.

Current production

Around 5 million bottles are produced in each vintage. The wine is 60% Chardonnay and 40% Pinot noir, with 6 g/L dosage. According to Tom Stevenson, "All vintages need at least 12 years ageing to nurture Dom Pérignon's signature silky mousse". As of 2020, the current release of Dom Pérignon is from the 2010 vintage and the current release of Dom Pérignon Rosé is from the 2006 vintage.   the senior winemaker was Richard Geoffroy, who has been chef de cave for Dom Pérignon since 1990.

Domaine Chandon

In 1973, the then Moët-Hennessy company founded Domaine Chandon, an outpost winery in the Napa Valley. It was the first French-owned sparkling wine venture in the United States. The fine dining restaurant étoile was situated at the winery, closing in December 2014.

Chandon had already founded an outpost in Argentina in 1959, and was doing the same in the southern city of Garibaldi in Brasil in 1973.
Domaine Chandon was later established in 1986 in Australia in Coldstream, Victoria, in the Ningxia region in China in 2013 and India's Nashik region in 2014.

Sponsorships

Moët was the official Formula One champagne provider between 1966 and 1999 and again from 2016 until 2017 when they signed a deal with champagne maker Carbon.

On 30 November 2012, Swiss tennis player Roger Federer became Moët et Chandon's brand ambassador. On 30 September 2015, Chandon announced it would be a sponsor of the McLaren F1 team starting 2016.

Pronunciation
Moët is pronounced with a "t" at the end ('mo-et') as the French-born founder's surname is of Dutch origin.

Songs
In the band Queen's song  "Killer Queen", the lead singer Freddie Mercury sings "She keeps her Moët et Chandon in her pretty cabinet"

Musician Prince mentions "a little Spanish man offering wine and Moët" in his song "Mr. Goodnight" from his Planet Earth album

In his song "Big Poppa", the rapper Notorious B.I.G. sings "at the back of the club sipping Moët is where you'll find me"

In his song, "Comin Thru", Chali 2na sings "I don't drink, my glass never will hold Moët"

In his song "Check Out My Melody", Rakim says: "Emcees that wanna be best, they're gonna be dissed if they don't get from in front of All they can go get is me a glass of Moët, A hard time, sip your juice and watch a smooth poet"

In his song "Curls", MF Doom sings, "Yup, you know it, growin' up too fast; showin' up to class with Moet in a flask"

In his song, "The Way Life Goes", the rapper Lil Uzi Vert sings "She's sipping Moët, and yeah, I swear it gets her wetter"

Craig David mentions Moët as part of his week-long date plans in the song "7 Days."

In his song "Bloodless", Andrew Bird sings "And the poets, they explode like bombs, While the gentry is drinking Moët Chandon"

In her song "The Roof", Mariah Carey sings "So we finished the Moët and started feeling liberated"

In his song "Cristal & MOЁT", a Russian rapper Morgenshtern sings "I pour Cristal or Chantel MOЁT, you were dreaming about it, now it's mine"

In his song “Represent,” rapper Nas sings “Yo, they call me Nas, I’m not your legal type of fella, Moët drinkin’, marijuana smokin’ street dweller”

In her song "The Motto", American singer Ava Max sings "popping that Moët, baby lets make some bubbles"

In her song "Muñecas", Argentinian singer Tini Stoessel sings "bottles are uncorked, tonight there will be rain of Moët".

See also
 Champagne in popular culture
 List of Champagne houses
 Champagne Riots

References

External links 

 
 
 

1743 establishments in France
British Royal Warrant holders
Champagne producers
Diageo brands
French brands
Luxury brands
LVMH brands
Purveyors to the Imperial and Royal Court
French companies established in 1743
Food and drink companies established in 1743